People with the surname Maxim include;

 Alexandru Maxim (born 1990), Romanian football player
 Cristian Maxim (born 2003), Romanian football player
 Florin Maxim (born 1981), Romanian football player
 Hiram Maxim (1840–1916), inventor of the Maxim Gun, the first machine gun
 Hiram Percy Maxim (1869–1936), founder of the American Radio Relay League
 Hiram Stevens Maxim (1840–1916), inventor and firearm designer
 Hudson Maxim (1853–1927), a U.S. inventor and chemist; brother of Hiram Maxim and uncle of Hiram Percy Maxim
 Joey Maxim (1922–2001), American boxer and one-time Light Heavyweight champion of the world
 John Maxim (1925–1990), English actor
 Marinela Maxim (born 1955), Romanian rower